

Captains
Garibaldi—Italian national hero. Captained a Peruvian clipper. 
 Gemmill - Scotland, then USA
 William D. Gregory, captain of the clipper Tejuca, which sank during a hurricane in 1856. 
Joseph Warren Holmes—American sea captain who sailed around Cape Horn 84 times; command of clipper Seminole.
Nathaniel Palmer—American seal hunter, explorer, sailing captain, and ship designer.
Robert Waterman (sea captain)—Clipper captain famous for making record-breaking times and for being rough on his crews.

Crew members
Adelbert Ames—Mate on a clipper, seaman on his father’s ship. Became a Union general in the Civil War, Reconstruction era politician, and Spanish–American War general.  
Hobart Bosworth—Cabin boy. Became a famous actor.
David Bernard Clarke—2nd Mate on the Surrey Official No. 12873  and the Challenger No. 10707  and 1st Mate on the Red Deer No. 47387.
Richard Henry Dana, author of Two Years Before the Mast
Michael Healy—Cabin boy on a clipper. Became the first African-American to command a ship of the United States government.
Benjamin Cheever Howard—Mate on Witchcraft, Golden Fleece, & Rising Son. Letters written from clippers at Bancroft Library & Peabody Essex Museum. Early San Francisco businessman (Howard & Pool).  
Edmund Rice—Apprentice to a clipper captain. Became a Brigadier General in the Union Army during the Civil War.

Passengers

Travellers
Charles Keeler—American author, adventure, poet, naturalist and advocate for the arts, particularly architecture. Traveled around Cape Horn on the clipper Charmer in 1893.
Sara Delano Roosevelt—Mother of Franklin Delano Roosevelt. Voyage to China at age eleven on the Surprise, with her mother and six brothers and sisters.
Corliss P. Stone—Elected Mayor of Seattle, 1872. Arrived on the West Coast on the clipper ship Archer.

Missionaries to China
Otis Gibson and Elizabeth Chamberlain Gibson. Sailed on a clipper for a mission to China a few months after their marriage.
James Joseph Meadows—One of the first missionaries of the China Inland Mission.
Hudson Taylor—Protestant missionary, founder of the China Inland Mission. Spent 51 years in China.

References

 
Clippers, people
Clippers